Pedro A. Vizcaíno Martínez (born October 11, 1966), sometimes known by the nickname "Cafetero", is a Cuban-born American artist. He was one of the members of Arte Calle "Street Art" group, between 1985 and 1987. He works in the mediums of painting, drawing, performance, and installation art.

Biography 
He was born on October 11, 1966 in Havana. Since 1993, he has resided primarily in Pequeña Habana, Miami, Florida. He attended the Academia Nacional de Bellas Artes San Alejandro, where he graduated in 1981. He continued his studies at the School of Artistic Education at the “Enrique José Varona” Superior Pedagogic Institute in 1985. 

Throughout his career his work has been exhibited at museums and galleries in the U.S., Spain, Cuba, Mexico, and Poland. Recent exhibitions include "Atopia" (Center of Contemporary Culture of Barcelona, 2010) and "Wild Child Graffiti" (Figarelli Contemporary. Scottsdale, Arizona, 2008). Vizcaíno's work is part of major collections such as Nina Menocal Collection (Mexico), Lowe Art Museum (Miami), Museum of Contemporary Art (North Miami), DACRA (Miami Beach), Kendall Art Center, Miami, Florida and Museum of Latin American Art (Long Beach, California).

References

Cuban contemporary artists
Living people
People from Havana
1966 births
Artists from Miami
Academia Nacional de Bellas Artes San Alejandro alumni